Macrophagic myofasciitis (MMF) is a histopathological finding involving inflammatory microphage formations with aluminium-containing crystal inclusions and associated microscopic muscle necrosis in biopsy samples of the deltoid muscle. Based on the presence of aluminium and the common practice of administering vaccines into the deltoid, it has been proposed that the abnormalities are a result of immunisation with aluminium adjuvant-containing vaccines. The findings were observed in a minority of persons being evaluated for "diffuse myalgias, arthralgias or muscle weakness" who underwent deltoid muscle biopsies. The individuals had a history of receiving aluminium-containing vaccines, administered months to several years prior to observation of MMF histopathology, however this link is tenuous and unsustainable. 

It has been subsequently proposed that macrophagic myofasciitis is in fact a systemic disorder where various diseases develop in association and as consequence of vaccination with aluminium-containing vaccines in susceptible individuals, however, the World Health Organization has concluded that "[t]here is no evidence to suggest that MMF is a specific illness", and that "[t]he current evidence neither establishes nor excludes a generalized disorder affecting other organs."


Description 
MMF was first described in 1998 by a consortium of French myopathologists as an emerging condition of unknown cause characterised by a defining lesion observed upon muscle biopsy. MMF was identified in patients affected by myalgia and fatigue. MMF was judged a consequence of a switch to intramuscular injection and the deltoid muscle being the preferred site of both vaccine injection and biopsy in France (while other sites were preferred for biopsy in other countries) and the commencement of HBV vaccination in French adults. Similar lesions could be detected in babies and children upon biopsy of the quadriceps as this is the site of vaccine administration in this group. MMF could also be experimentally reproduced in animals, with regression over time. It has been proposed that in a small portion of the population, vaccination results in persistence of aluminium-compound particles in macrophages in association with myalgia, fatigue, and cognitive dysfunction. A MMF disorder has been compared to autoimmune/inflammatory syndrome induced by adjuvants. A case-controlled study in France found those with MMF were more likely to have received aluminium-containing vaccines. MMF was also associated with fatigue “and related functional limitations", with fatigue more common in the beginning of the malady that led to the biopsy. However, neither myalgia, arthralgia, nor any other symptoms or risk factors were identified as specific to those with MMF.

Many of those with MMF had previously been treated for malaria with chloroquine or hydroxychloroquine.

As of 2009, with few exceptions, MMF had only been reported in France.

References 

Muscular disorders
Vaccination
Rare diseases
Alternative diagnoses
Pseudoscience